ISO/IEC 19794 Information technology—Biometric data interchange formats—Part 5: Face image data, or ISO/IEC 19794-5 for short, is the fifth of 8 parts of the ISO/IEC standard ISO/IEC 19794, published in 2005, which describes interchange formats for several types of biometric data. ISO/IEC 19794-5 defines specifically a standard scheme for codifying data describing human faces within a CBEFF-compliant data structure, for use in facial recognition systems. Modern biometric passport photos should comply with this standard. Many organizations and have already started enforcing its directives, and several software applications have been created to automatically test compliance to the specifications.

The standard is intended to allow computer analysis of face images for automated face identification (one-to-many searching) and authentication (one-to-one matching), as well as human identification of distinctive features such as moles and scars that might be used to verify identity, and human verification of computer identification results.

In order to enable applications that run on a variety of devices, including those with limited  resources (such as embedded systems), and to improve face recognition accuracy, the specification describes not only the data format, but also additional requirements, namely: scene constraints (lighting, pose, expression, etc.); photographic properties (positioning, camera focus etc.); and digital image attributes (image resolution, image size, etc.).

Four face image types are introduced to define categories that satisfy the needs of different applications, and the requirements above are specified for each image type:
 Basic: the fundamental Face Image Type that specifies a record format including header and image data. All the remaining Face Image Types inherit the properties of this type. No mandatory scene, photographic and digital requirements are specified for this image type.
 Frontal: consists of an extension to the Basic Face Image Type to conform to requirements appropriate for frontal face recognition. Two variants of the Frontal Face Image Type are defined:
 Full Frontal: A Face Image Type that specifies frontal images with sufficient resolution for human examination as well as reliable computer face recognition. This type of Face Image Type includes the full head with all hair in most cases, as well as neck and shoulders. This image type is suitable for permanent storage of the face information, and it is applicable to ID portraits for passport, driver's license, and mug shot images.
 Token Frontal: specifies frontal images with a specific geometric size and eye positioning based on the width and height of the image. It requires less detail, which makes it suitable for less demanding applications.

References

External links 
 
 ISO/IEC 19794-5 preview

ISO/IEC 19794
Biometrics